Michael McCann, also known as "Behavior", is a Canadian composer for television, video games, and film. He is best known for composing the scores to the video games Tom Clancy's Splinter Cell: Double Agent, Deus Ex: Human Revolution, XCOM: Enemy Unknown, Deus Ex: Mankind Divided and Borderlands 3.

McCann's music incorporates elements of electronic, orchestral and traditional acoustic instruments, and often includes the use of world, choral, and solo vocals (primarily female, and primarily lyric-less). His scoring work, as well as solo and production work, bridges multiple genres including ambient, world, jazz, break-beat, post-rock, trip-hop, drum and bass, industrial, rock and pop.

McCann has received award nominations for his work in television, games & film, from the British Academy of Film and Television Arts, Academy of Interactive Arts & Sciences, IGN, Spike TV Video Game Awards, G.A.N.G., Hollywood Music In Media Awards, and G4TV X-Play. His sound-design work on the film It's All Gone Pete Tong also earned him two Genie Award nominations for Best Overall Sound Editing and Best Overall Sound.

Past projects include original composition work for MTV, VH1, Discovery Channel, The Gap / Old Navy, Paramount Pictures, Alliance Atlantis (various films / trailers), Showcase, Audiokinetic, Odeon Films, Ubisoft, NASA, the Canadian Space Agency, FUBAR (as supervising sound-designer), and various commercials and independent films.

Awards and nominations

References

External links

Official Website for Michael McCann

Canadian electronic musicians
Canadian composers
Canadian male composers
Canadian film score composers
Male film score composers
Living people
Video game composers
1976 births
Tom Clancy's Splinter Cell
21st-century Canadian composers
Canadian sound editors
Canadian sound designers